Marshall Stream is a meltwater stream in Victoria Land, Antarctica. The stream was observed by Troy L. Pewe, a glacial geologist with U.S. Navy Operation Deep Freeze, 1957–58, and the name was applied by the New Zealand Antarctic Place-Names Committee and the Advisory Committee on Antarctic Names in consultation, and derives from its location in Marshall Valley.

References

Rivers of Victoria Land
Scott Coast